Reidar Hjermstad (born 10 October 1937) is a former Norwegian cross-country skier and biathlete who competed in the 1960s and 1970s.  

In 1963, Hjermstad won two events at the Lahti, Finland ski games, earning a Salpausselkä Medal. For his Lahti successes, Hjermstad earned the Norwegian Sportsperson of the Year (Norwegian: Årets Idrettsnavn) in 1963.

Hjermstad represented Norway in the winter olympics 3 times: Grenoble, France in 1964, Innsbruck, Austria in 1968) and Sapporo, Japan 1972.
His best Olympic result was 4th place in the 50 km at the 1972 Winter Olympics in Sapporo, Japan.

In 1971 he was awarded Norwegian skiing's highest award for competitors: The Holmenkollen Medal

Reidar Hjermstad won a total of 5 National Gold medals (NM gull) in cross-country skiing:
1963 Lørenskog in the 15 km.
1964 Furnes in the 50 km (here he was also awarded the Kongepokalen by Olav V, the King of Norway)
1968 Fossum in the 15 km 
1967 Skorovatn in the 3 x 10 km relay for Hernes IL 
1969 Alvdal in the 50 km

Hjermstad also won the National Gold medal title in Biathlon in Sørkedalen, Oslo 1960.

He was also a very good track & field runner. He won bronze medal in the Norwegian Championship, 10 000 m in 1962 . The time was 30.22,6. He represented the track & field club IK Tjalve from 1963-1968. His personal records are: 14.15,8 (5 000 m in 1964), and 30.02,0 (10 000 m while representing Norway against Denmark at Bislett stadium in 1962.

Cross-country skiing results
All results are sourced from the International Ski Federation (FIS).

Olympic Games

World Championships

References

Holmenkollen medalists - click Holmenkollmedaljen for downloadable pdf file 
Norwegian biathlon champions 
Salpausselkä Medalists
Sportsperson of the Year

External links

1937 births
Living people
Cross-country skiers at the 1968 Winter Olympics
Cross-country skiers at the 1972 Winter Olympics
Holmenkollen medalists
Norwegian male biathletes
Norwegian male cross-country skiers
Olympic cross-country skiers of Norway